Robert Cromie (1855–1907) was a Northern Irish journalist and novelist.

Early life and family
Robert Cromie was the third son of Dr. Cromie J.P., of Clough, the local registrar of births and deaths and ruling elder of Clough Presbyterian church.
Robert's elder sister, Annie Howe Cromie (1849-1939), to whom he was particularly close, was the wife of John Jordan, and named her second son after him. Through Cromie's mother, a Miss Henry of Ballyhosset (near Downpatrick), he was descended from Gilbert Howe (c.1626-c.1712), of Ballytrim (near Killyleagh), the confidential servant to James Hamilton, 1st Earl of Clanbrassil, and was thus connected by blood to many of the leading families in East Down.

Cromie was born on 17 July 1855 at Clough. He was educated at home before being sent with an older brother to the Royal Belfast Academical Institution where, according to one article, he claimed "an unbeaten record in the matter of examinations, having never once failed, by reason... of having never once entered".

Career
Instead of pursuing an academic path, Cromie followed one of his brothers, Andrew Gilbert Howe Cromie (d. 1937), into the Ulster Bank and worked in various parts of Ireland including Donegal, Trim and Derry.  His final posting was to the Ulster Bank's head office in Waring Street, Belfast.  While working in Trim, Cromie developed a close friendship with Charles Reichel, Bishop of Meath, an association regarded as influential on the development of Cromie's style.

His first book, For England's Sake, was published in 1889.

A Plunge into Space, a science fiction novel, was published in 1890. It was well received and Jules Verne wrote a preface to the second edition in 1891.  The work predates H. G. Wells's The First Men in the Moon by some 10 years, but contains a number of similarities.  Cromie pointed these out in letters to the Academy journal.  Cromie's 1895 novel The Crack of Doom was his most successful and contains the first description of an atomic explosion.

In the early 1880s, Cromie contributed many articles to cycling magazines, most to The Wheel World, describing bicycle tours around Ulster.
Cromie's other great passion was golf. He was a member of the Ormeau Golf Club and was captain in 1898.

Death
Robert Cromie died unmarried in his rooms at 95 South Parade Belfast in April 1907.

Bibliography 
For England's Sake, London & New York: Frederick Warne & Co., 1889
A Plunge into Space, London & New York: Frederick Warne & Co, 1890
The Crack of Doom, London: Digby, Long & Co, 1895; London: George Newnes, 1896.
The Next Crusade, London: Hutchinson & Co, 1896
The King's Oak, and Other Stories, London: R. Aickin & Co; Belfast: Geo. Newnes, 1897
The Lost Liner, London: R. Aickin & Co; Belfast: Geo. Newnes, 1898 
Through Southern Norway, Belfast: R. Aickin & Co. Ltd., 1898
Kitty's Victoria Cross, London & New York: Frederick Warne & Co, 1901
A New Messiah: A Novel, London: Digby, Long & Co, 1901
The Shadow of the Cross, London: Ward, Lock & Co, 1902
The Romance of Poisons: being weird episodes from life, London: Jarrold & Sons, 1903. (co-authored with T. S. Wilson)
El Dorado, London: Ward, Lock & Co, 1904
Told in the Twilight, Dublin: Sealy, Bryers & Walker, 1907[?]

References

External links
 
 
 
 Diarmuid Kennedy, "Belfast Boom", Verbal Magazine, November 2010
 Bibliography at Fantastic Fiction – with cover images
 

1907 deaths
Journalists from Northern Ireland
Male novelists from Northern Ireland
Science fiction writers from Northern Ireland
1856 births
Writers from Belfast
19th-century British novelists
Irish fantasy writers